Grove's dictionary may refer to:

 The Grove Dictionary of Art, former name of Oxford Art Online
 The New Grove Dictionary of Music and Musicians, 
 The New Grove Dictionary of Opera